Limina (Sicilian: Lìmmina) is a comune (municipality) in the Metropolitan City of Messina in the Italian region Sicily, located about  east of Palermo and about  southwest of Messina in the Peloritani mountains.

Limina borders the following municipalities: Antillo, Casalvecchio Siculo, Forza d'Agrò, Mongiuffi Melia, Roccafiorita.

References

Cities and towns in Sicily